Rizwan Manji (born October 17, 1974) is a Canadian actor. He is known best for his portrayals of Ray Butani on Schitt's Creek, Tick Pickwick on The Magicians, Rajiv Gidwani in the NBC Universal TV series Outsourced, and Jamil in the DC Extended Universe (DCEU) television series Peacemaker (2022–present) and film Shazam! Fury of the Gods (2023).

Early life
Manji was born in Toronto, Ontario, to Indian parents who emigrated from Tanzania. His family is Ismaili-Muslim of Gujarati Indian descent, and he has said that his religion is very important to him. When Manji was in grade one, he and his family moved to Calgary, Alberta, where he was raised. He graduated from Crescent Heights High School. 

Manji's parents wanted him to go to university to earn a degree, but he wanted to be an actor. He attended the University of Alberta, where his sister Rishma was enrolled. The only class he enjoyed there was drama. In 1992 Manji enrolled at the American Musical and Dramatic Academy in New York City.

Career
During the early years of Manji's career, he played small parts in various films and television shows, with recurring roles in Privileged, Better Off Ted and 24. 

From 2010 to 2011, Manji played Rajiv Gidwani on the NBC comedy Outsourced. He initially auditioned for the role of Gupta; Parvesh Cheena got the part, but the producers cast Manji as the scheming assistant manager Rajiv. 

Manji played Ray Butani on the CBC comedy Schitt's Creek from 2015 to 2020, for which he was nominated for a Canadian Screen Award.

He also appeared in seasons 2-5 of The Magicians, a fantasy television series on SyFy. 

In 2019, he starred in the NBC comedy Perfect Harmony as Reverend Jax, a missionary who runs a church. The show, which starred Bradley Whitford, was cancelled after one season. 

Manji has also appeared in a GEICO commercial as a customer in the checkout aisle who wins the "auction," and in commercials for Kmart, LendingTree, National Car Rental, and The UPS Store.

Manji co-hosts a podcast titled The Brighter Side of News.

Personal life
Manji lives in Studio City, California, with his wife and three children. He has spoken openly about issues facing South Asian and Muslim actors in Hollywood.

Filmography

Film

Television

Video games

References

External links

1974 births
Living people
Canadian expatriates in the United States
Canadian Ismailis
Canadian male film actors
Canadian male television actors
Canadian male voice actors
Canadian people of Gujarati descent
Canadian people of Indian descent
Canadian people of Tanzanian descent
Male actors from California
Male actors from Toronto
Gujarati people
People from Gujarat
People from Studio City, Los Angeles
20th-century Canadian male actors
21st-century Canadian male actors
American Musical and Dramatic Academy alumni
Khoja Ismailism